is a Japanese light novel series written by Shirow Shiratori and illustrated by Shirabi. SB Creative have released seventeen volumes since 2015 under their GA Bunko label. A manga adaptation with art by Kogetaokoge was serialized in Square Enix's seinen manga magazine Young Gangan from 2015 to 2019, and has been collected in ten tankōbon volumes. A 12-episode anime television series adaptation by Project No.9 aired from January to March 2018.

Plot
Yaichi Kuzuryū is a prodigy shogi player who won the title of Ryūō at the age of 16. Following his victory, he has been in a slump until he is approached by Ai Hinatsuru, a 9-year-old elementary school girl who begs him to make her his disciple. Astonished by Ai's potential, Yaichi agrees to become her master, and the two then brace themselves together in the world of shogi with their friends and rivals. However, this comes with the condition imposed by Ai's mother that Yaichi is to marry Ai if she does not become a major player before graduating middle school.

Characters

The main protagonist of the series. Yaichi is a sixteen-year-old who won the Ryūō title match at a young age. He is the current youngest Ryūō. Initially, he was overwhelmed by his title and perceived pressure to avoid playing in a "disgraceful" manner. He has a calm personality and often doesn't take things seriously unless they are related to shogi. He was taken aback by Ai's talent and determination, and the way she continues to fight and seek a way to victory has helped inspire him. Yaichi is often wrongly accused of being a lolicon due to the affection he gains from young girls like Ai and her friends Mio, Ayano, and Charlotte in her shogi training group. Despite their affections for him, he is oblivious to their true feelings for him. Yaichi tries to be a good master to his disciples and does his best to teach the easiest steps so that his disciples can catch on quickly. He seems to have feelings for Keika as seen in some episodes of the anime. His play style basically sticks with Static Rook, famous for using Sente's Double Wing Attack and Gote's Tempo Loss Bishop Exchange strategies. 
While sometimes it is misunderstood that his name "Yaichi" refers to the eighty-one koma on the shogi board, it actually refers to his birthday, August 1st. Starting from Volume 6, it is implied that stunned by the talent of Yaichi after his 4-3 comeback victory against the Meijin from a 0-3 deficit, the players in Kantō, the East side of Japan, start calling him with a new nickname, which in the story is deliberately hidden from readers as something-"King", and also not known by Yaichi himself because he avoids reading the comments about him on the Internet. The nickname is finally revealed to readers at the very end of Volume 12. 

Yaichi's childhood friend and fellow disciple. Ginko is sharp-tongued, brash, and shows no mercy to her opponents in shogi. She is fourteen years old and considered the most talented female player in the shogi history, one of few with enough talent to potentially enter the main shogi league as a full-fledged professional rather than a professional in the women's league. Ginko currently holds an impressive undefeated record at 47 wins against female pros earning her the name "The Snow White of Naniwa". She became a disciple before Yaichi despite being two years younger than him. She never entered the women's league and continues to pursue the main Japan Shogi Association, and is implied to have done this to pursue Yaichi himself. Though not a female professional, she still holds the Queen and Female Gyokuza (lit. "Throne") titles. Despite her aggressive attitude towards Yaichi, Ginko cares deeply about and has feelings for him, though she is hesitant to show it. In Volume 11, Yaichi confesses to Ginko and she reciprocates his feelings. He brings her to his hometown and confesses to her under the stunning starry night there because that scenery is what he first thought of when he first met her and knew her name.

Yaichi's first disciple, a nine-year-old third grader. She is a cheerful girl with extreme talent for shogi, as well as the daughter of the owners of a large and popular inn which has been the site for major matches in Ishikawa. She holds great admiration for Yaichi for his determination and refusal to give up after witnessing his Ryūō match. She first met an exhausted Yaichi during his previous Ryūō title match, where after rejuvenating him with a glass of water, Yaichi promised to grant her any wish if he won. Three months after the title match, she ran away from home to become Yaichi's disciple. Initially accepted as a temporary disciple over spring break, her parents tried to bring her home claiming concerns about the stability of life as a female professional. She failed their conditions to continue her discipleship, but Yaichi was sufficiently impressed by her determination and performance under great pressure. Afterwards he personally requests to take her on, even accepting the condition that, if she fails to claim a title before graduating junior high, he would marry her and inherit the inn. She is exceptionally possessive of Yaichi and occasionally demonstrates yandere traits. In shogi, she is extremely good at tsume shogi, which is why her style places so much emphasis on the late game. Besides, her style is primarily "offensive", focused on finding ways to press the attack. 

Yaichi's second disciple, also nine years old and in the third grade. She has been living with her wealthy grandfather since her parents' deaths. Her father was a skilled amateur shogi player who'd met a younger Yaichi years ago while having an exhibition match against the Meijin. After Yaichi found a path that would have given him a checkmate, Ai's father had suggested that Yaichi someday take his daughter as a disciple, to which he agreed. She was frustrated to see that he does not remember her father, who'd never stopped admiring him, but eventually accepted his request to make her his disciple. She is very proud and prone to display tsundere traits. 
Her shogi style is opposite to Ai's, showing a deep understanding of the early game and a strong insight into "defensive" play, based on traps and counterattacks. The way her style complements Hinatsuru Ai's is part of the reason that Yaichi felt she'd make a great rival for her. Besides, she is good at using Gote's Tempo Loss Bishop Exchange, which, together with her "defensive" play style, are the influences by her master, Yaichi. Yaichi gained so much respect from her father that she learned from Yaichi's every kifu her father could acquire before she really meet Yaichi. 

Yaichi and Ginko's elder disciple and biological daughter of their master. She entered the training association to attempt to become a female professional at the age of ten. At twenty-five, she is rapidly approaching the maximum age at which one can become a professional or female professional, a fact that is frequently demonstrated to cause a great deal of pressure for her. She is noted to be quite skilled when she relaxes, but still has a tendency to fall back into the standard basics and freeze up when opponents step out of common patterns. 

Yaichi's best friend and two years older than him. He is same level as talented as Yaichi in shogi and called as the "Next Meijin" for his fast promotions in the Japan Shogi Association. He is prone to display chūnibyō traits, for example, calling himself as "God Cauldron" instead of Kannebe, and referring the rival relationship between him and Yaichi as the war between a holy knight and a demon king. 

A friend of Ai's from the training group.

A friend of Ai's from the training group.

A friend of Ai's from the training group, who is only six years old. A first grader attending a French school in Kyoto, she speaks with a childish, uneasy Japanese. She starts to be interested in shogi because of Naruto. Yaichi finds himself frequently overwhelmed by her cuteness, much to Ai's chagrin. She studies under the same master as Ayano. Not wanting to hurt Charlotte's feelings when he refused to switch and become her master, Yaichi offered to make her his "bride" instead. While this was successful in avoiding trauma from his rejection, her repeated mention of this "proposal" has caused some trouble for him. She seems to have an interest in Yaichi as seen in the anime.

Ai's father and Akina's husband. Having married into his wife's family, he is unable to contradict her.

Ai's mother and Takashi's wife, and proprietor of a prestigious inn. She attempts to prevent Ai from pursuing a shogi career claiming concern over the stability of such a life. When her daughter failed to satisfy her requirements she attempted to take her back home, but relented and accepted Yaichi's personal request to take her as a disciple under the condition that, should she fail to achieve at least one title before graduating junior high, Yaichi would marry into their family and inherit the inn.

Media

Light novels
The Ryuo's Work is Never Done! is written by Shirow Shiratori and illustrated by Shirabi. SB Creative have released seventeen volumes since 2015 under their GA Bunko label. An English translated digital release is done by BookWalker.

Manga
A manga adaptation with art by Kogetaokoge was serialized in Square Enix's seinen manga magazine Young Gangan from October 2, 2015 to August 2, 2019. The series covers the story of the first five volumes of the light novels.

Anime
An anime television series adaptation by Project No.9 was announced in July 2017. The series was directed by Shinsuke Yanagi with scripts written by Fumihiko Shimo and character designs by Akane Yano. Kenji Kawai composed the music at Nippon Columbia, and Dreamshift produced the series. The series aired from January 8 to March 26, 2018, and it ran for 12 episodes. Machico performed the opening theme song , while Miku Itō performed the ending theme song . Same as the manga series, the anime series also covers the story of the first five volumes of the light novels.

Video game
A video game based on the series was released for the PlayStation 4 and Nintendo Switch on November 26, 2020.

Reception
The light novel ranked first in 2017 in Takarajimasha's annual light novel guide book Kono Light Novel ga Sugoi!, in the bunkobon category. It ranked first again in 2018, second in 2019, and second again in 2020. As of August, 2020, over 2 million of copies have been sold.

 listed the book as one of four "essential" novels introducing shogi to a wider audience, saying that it was well-researched and that people familiar with the shogi world can guess on whom the characters of the Meijin and Maestro are based.

See also
No-Rin, another light novel series by the same author

Notes

References

External links
 

2018 anime television series debuts
2015 Japanese novels
Anime and manga based on light novels
AT-X (TV network) original programming
Comedy anime and manga
Crunchyroll anime
GA Bunko
Gangan Comics manga
Light novels
Novels set in Osaka
Project No.9
Seinen manga
Shogi in anime and manga
Television shows based on light novels
Television shows set in Osaka